The Oden Institute for Computational Engineering and Sciences is an interdisciplinary research unit and graduate program at  The University of Texas at Austin dedicated to advancing computational science and engineering through a variety of programs and research centers. The Institute currently supports 16 research centers, seven research groups and maintains the Computational Sciences, Engineering and Mathematics Program, a graduate degree program leading to the M.S. and Ph.D. degrees in Computational Science, Engineering and Mathematics. The interdisciplinary programs underway at the Oden Institute involve 123 faculty representing 23 academic departments and five schools and colleges. Oden Institute faculty hold positions in the Cockrell School of Engineering, College of Natural Sciences, Jackson School of Geosciences, Dell Medical School and McCombs School of Business. The Institute also supports the Peter O'Donnell, Jr. Postdoctoral Fellowship program and a program for visiting scholars through the J. Tinsley Oden Faculty Fellowship Research Fund. Organizationally, the Oden Institute reports to the Vice President for Research.

Research centers and groups

The Oden Institute supports 23 research centers and research groups. Each center and group is organized around a research topic and is directed by an Oden Institute faculty member.
Applied Mathematics Group
Autonomous Systems Group
Center for Computational Astronautical Sciences and Technologies (CAST)
Center for Computational GeoSciences and Optimization
Center for Computational Life Sciences and Biology
Center for Computational Materials
Center for Computational Molecular Science
Center for Computational Oncology
Center for Distributed and Grid Computing
Center for Numerical Analysis
Center for Predictive Engineering and Computational Science
Center for Quantum Materials Engineering
Center for Scientific Machine Learning
Center for Subsurface Modeling
Computational Hydraulics Group
Computational Mechanics Group
Computational Research in Ice and Ocean Systems
Computational Visualization Center
Electromagnetics and Acoustics Group
Parallel Algorithms for Data Analysis and Simulation Group
Probabilistic and High Order Inference, Computation, Estimation and Simulation
Science of High-Performance Computing Group
Willerson Center for Cardiovascular Modeling and Simulation

Programs 

The Oden Institute supports seven major programs that seek to promote computational science at various levels.
The Computational Sciences, Engineering and Mathematics Program (CSEM)
A graduate program for MS and PhD students
Peter O'Donnell, Jr. Postdoctoral Fellowship Program
Supports the research of recent doctorates
J. Tinsley Oden Faculty Fellowship Research Program
Brings researchers and scholars from academia, government and industry to the institute to collaborate with Oden Institute researchers
Moncrief Endowed Position
Used to support outstanding junior faculty
Moncrief Grand Challenge Awards Program
Provides funding and resources for University of Texas at Austin faculty who work on challenges that affect national competitiveness
The Moncrief Undergraduate Summer Internship Program
Supports undergraduate interns who work with ICES faculty during the summer
Undergraduate certificate program
Allows junior and senior level students at The University of Texas at Austin the opportunity to study computational engineering and sciences, and have their studies recognized with a certificate.

Notable faculty 

Ivo Babuška
Chandrajit Bajaj
Luis Caffarelli
James R. Chelikowsky
Bjorn Engquist
Irene M. Gamba
Omar Ghattas
Thomas J.R. Hughes
Moriba K. Jah
Robert Moser
J. Tinsley Oden
William H. Press
Mary Wheeler
Karen Willcox

References

External links
Oden Institute for Computational Engineering and Sciences

University of Texas at Austin